Choi Tak Estate, formerly Choi Wan Road Site 2 and Choi Wan Road Site 3A, is a public housing estate in Ping Shan, Kowloon, Hong Kong next to Choi Ying Estate. Choi Tak Estate is a part of the housing development near Jordan Valley. It is developed into two phases and all blocks were completed in 2010 and 2011 respectively.

Background
Formerly a quarry site, the Housing Authority had set up the "Choi Wan Road Historical Trail" under Choi King House, Choi Leung House, Choi Yin House and Choi Tak Shopping Centre to convey the historical carrier with pictures and historical display panels for the public to learn about the life and history of the quarry and its surroundings, and promote the history of the quarry to the world.

Houses

Demographics
According to the 2016 by-census, Choi Tak Estate had a population of 17,420. The median age was 40.7 and the majority of residents (97.8 per cent) were of Chinese ethnicity. The average household size was 3 people. The median monthly household income of all households (i.e. including both economically active and inactive households) was HK$21,520.

Politics
Choi Tak Estate is located in Choi Tak constituency of the Kwun Tong District Council. It is currently represented by Tam Siu-cheuk, who was elected in the 2019 elections.

Education
Choi Tak Estate is in Primary One Admission (POA) School Net 46. Within the school net are multiple aided schools (operated independently but funded with government money); no government primary schools are in this net.

See also

Public housing estates in Ngau Tau Kok and Kowloon Bay

References

Ngau Tau Kok
Public housing estates in Hong Kong